Lie Eng Soei (born 15 May 1917, date of death unknown) was an Indonesian sailor. He competed in the Flying Dutchman event at the 1960 Summer Olympics.

References

External links
 

1917 births
Year of death missing
Indonesian male sailors (sport)
Olympic sailors of Indonesia
Sailors at the 1960 Summer Olympics – Flying Dutchman
People from Tangerang